Li Zhe (born January 31, 1989) is a Chinese professional Go player.

Biography
Li was born in China. At 11 years of age, Li Zhe became one of the youngest professional Go players ever. Two years later, in 2002, Li was promoted to 3 dan. Li made more history in 2006 when he became the youngest title holder in China, at 16 years old.

Titles & runners-up

References 

1989 births
Chinese Go players
Living people
Sportspeople from Wuhan